Monster is a Japanese manga series written and illustrated by Naoki Urasawa. It was published by Shogakukan in their seinen manga magazine Big Comic Original between December 1994 and December 2001, with its chapters collected in 18 tankōbon volumes. The story revolves around Kenzo Tenma, a Japanese surgeon living in Düsseldorf, Germany whose life enters turmoil after getting himself involved with Johan Liebert, one of his former patients, who is revealed to be a dangerous serial killer.

Urasawa later wrote and illustrated the novel Another Monster, a story detailing the events of the manga from an investigative reporter's point of view, which was published in 2002. The manga was adapted by Madhouse into a 74-episode anime television series, which aired on Nippon TV from April 2004 to September 2005. The manga and anime were both licensed by Viz Media for English releases in North America, and the anime was broadcast on several television channels. In 2013, Siren Visual licensed the anime for Australia.

Monster was Urasawa's first work to receive international acclaim and success; the manga has sold over 20 million copies, making it one of the best-selling manga series of all time. The manga has won several awards, including the 46th Shogakukan Manga Award and the Japan Media Arts Festival. Its anime adaptation has been called one of the best anime series of its decade.

Plot

Dr. Kenzo Tenma is a young Japanese brain surgeon, working at Eisler Memorial Hospital in Düsseldorf, West Germany. Tenma is dissatisfied with the political bias of the hospital in treating patients, and seizes the chance to change things after a massacre brings fraternal twins Johan and Anna Liebert into the hospital. Johan has a gunshot wound to his head, and Anna mutters about killing; Tenma operates on Johan instead of the mayor, who arrived later. Johan is saved, but Mayor Roedecker dies; Tenma loses his social standing. Director Heinemann and the other doctors in Tenma's way are mysteriously murdered, and both children disappear from the hospital. The police suspect Tenma, but they have no evidence and can only question him.

Nine years later, Tenma is Chief of Surgery at Eisler Memorial. After saving a criminal named Adolf Junkers, Junkers mutters about a "monster." Tenma returns with a clock for Junkers, he finds the guard in front of Junkers' room dead and Junkers gone. Following the trail to the construction site of a half-finished building near the hospital, Tenma finds Junkers held at gunpoint. Junkers warns him against coming closer and pleads with him to run away. Tenma refuses, and the man holding the gun is revealed to be Johan Liebert. Despite Tenma's attempts to reason with him, Johan shoots Junkers. Telling Tenma he could never kill the man who saved his life, he walks off into the night, with Tenma too shocked to stop him.

Tenma is suspected by the police, particularly BKA Inspector Lunge, and he tries to find more information about Johan. He soon discovers that the boy's sister is living a happy life as an adopted daughter; the only traces of her terrible past are a few nightmares. Tenma finds Anna, who was subsequently named Nina by her foster parents, on her birthday; he keeps her from Johan, but is too late to stop him from murdering her foster parents. Tenma eventually learns the origins of this "monster": from the former East Germany's attempt to use a secret orphanage known as "511 Kinderheim" to create perfect soldiers through psychological reprogramming, to the author of children's books used in a eugenics experiment in the former Czechoslovakia. Tenma learns the scope of the atrocities committed by this "monster", and vows to fix the mistake he made by saving Johan's life.

Production
Urasawa revealed that he pitched the idea of writing a manga about the medical field around 1986, but could tell his editor was not enjoying the idea. So he jokingly proposed a story about women's judo, and that lead to his first solo work Yawara! (1986–1993).

The original idea for Monster came from the 1960s American television series The Fugitive, which had a strong impact on Urasawa when he saw it at the age of eight. In the story, a doctor is wrongfully convicted of murder, but escapes and searches for the real killer while on the run from the police. He said that his editor was adamant that the series would not do well, and tried to stop him from creating it.

The Japanese medical industry was strongly influenced by the professional practices in Germany, thus it seemed natural to the author to set Monster in Germany. Post-war Germany was chosen so that the neo-Nazi movement could be included in the story. When he started the semimonthly Monster at the end of 1994, Urasawa was already writing Happy! weekly and continued to serialize both at the same time. When Happy! ended in 1999, he began the weekly 20th Century Boys. Writing both Monster and 20th Century Boys at the same time caused him to be briefly hospitalized for exhaustion.

Media

Manga

Written and illustrated by Naoki Urasawa, Monster was serialized in Shōgakukan's seinen manga magazine Big Comic Original from December 1994 to December 2001. Shōgakukan collected its 162 chapters into 18 tankōbon volumes released from 30 June 1995 to 28 February 2002. Takashi Nagasaki is credited as "co-producer" of the manga's story. Monster received a nine-volume kanzenban re-release between 30 January and 29 August 2008.

Monster was licensed in North America by Viz Media, who published all 18 volumes between 21 February 2006 and 16 December 2008. They released the kanzenban version of the series, titled Monster: The Perfect Edition, between 15 July 2014 and 19 July 2016.

Anime

The manga series was adapted into an anime by Madhouse, which aired between 7 April 2004 and 28 September 2005 on Nippon TV. Directed by Masayuki Kojima and written by Tatsuhiko Urahata, it features original character designs by long-time Studio Ghibli animator Kitarō Kōsaka which were adapted for the anime by Shigeru Fujita.

The anime includes an instrumental theme by the Chilean folk music group Quilapayún, "Transiente", which originally appeared on their 1984 album Tralalí Tralalá. David Sylvian was commissioned to write the ending theme, "For the Love of Life", on which he collaborated with Haishima Kuniaki. In the cover notes to the official soundtrack he said, "I was attracted to the Monster material by the moral dilemma faced by its central character. The calm surface of the music giving way to darker undercurrents, signifying the conscience of the lead protagonist and the themes of morality, fate, resignation, and free will."

An English dub of Monster was produced by Salami Studios for Viz Media, which had the North American license to the anime. The show aired on Syfy's Ani-Mondays with two episodes back-to-back each Monday night at 11:00 pm EST, beginning 12 October 2009, as well as on its sister network Chiller. A DVD box set of the series, containing the first 15 episodes was released 8 December 2009. However, due to low sales of the first box set, Viz decided not to continue releasing the remaining episodes on DVD and later dropped the license. Monster began airing on Canada's Super Channel on 15 March 2010, and on the Funimation Channel on 3 April 2010 on weekends at 12:30 am. The series was also available digitally from several internet retailers. Siren Visual licensed the series for Australia in 2013, and released it in five DVD volumes beginning in November 2013.

Netflix began streaming the series internationally on 1 January 2023, premiering the first 30 episodes; the entire 74 episodes were made available on 1 February of the same year.

The credit sequence features illustrations from the book Obluda, Která Nemá Své Jméno (The Monster Who Didn't Have A Name) by Emil Scherbe which was published by Shogakukan on 30 September 2008.

Live-action adaptations
In 2005, it was announced that New Line Cinema acquired the rights for an American live-action film adaptation of Monster. Academy Award-nominated screenwriter Josh Olson (A History of Violence) was hired to write the screenplay. No new information on the film was released since.

In 2013, it was revealed that Guillermo del Toro and American premium television network HBO were collaborating on a pilot for a live-action TV series based on Monster. Co-executive producer Stephen Thompson (Doctor Who and Sherlock) was writing the pilot, while del Toro was to direct it and be an executive producer alongside Don Murphy and Susan Montford. In 2015, del Toro told Latino-Review that HBO had passed on the project and that they were in the process of pitching to other studios.

Reception

Manga
Monster has been critically acclaimed. It won an Excellence Prize in the Manga Division at the first Japan Media Arts Festival in 1997; and the Grand Prize of the 3rd Tezuka Osamu Cultural Prize in 1999. It also won the 46th Shogakukan Manga Award in the General category in 2001; and the Best Manga Series at the Lucca Comics Awards in 2004. The Young Adult Library Services Association placed Monster on their 2007 Great Graphic Novels for Teens list. Viz Media's English release was nominated several times for Eisner Awards, twice in the category Best U.S. Edition of International Material – Japan (2007 and 2009) and three times in Best Continuing Series (2007, 2008, 2009). In 2009, when Oricon conducted a poll asking which manga series the Japanese people wanted to see adapted into live-action, Monster came in fifth. At the 2009 Industry Awards held by the Society for the Promotion of Japanese Animation, the organizers of Anime Expo, Monster won the award for Best Drama Manga. The Monster manga has over 20 million copies in circulation.

Writing for Time, Pulitzer Prize for Fiction winner Junot Díaz praised the manga, proclaiming "Urasawa is a national treasure in Japan, and if you ain't afraid of picture books, you'll see why". About.com'''s Deb Aoki called Monster a multi-layered suspense series and satisfying mystery that stands up to repeat readings, although it is sometimes a "little hard to follow". Reviewing the Monster manga for Anime News Network, Carl Kimlinger called Urasawa a master of suspense "effortlessly maintaining the delicate balance of deliberate misinformation and explicit delineation of the dangers facing protagonists that only the finest suspense thrillers ever achieve." He commented that even the stories and characters that had felt unrelated to the greater picture are "eventually drawn together by Johan's grand plan." Kimlinger deemed the art "invisible perfection," never "showy or superfluous," with panels laid out so well that it is easy to forget how much effort is put into each and every page. Though he did not find the characters' physical designs attractive, he praised their expressiveness, writing that the characters "wear their personalities on their faces, communicating changes in their outlooks, psychology, inner thoughts and emotions with shifts in expression that range from barely perceptible to masks of rage, hate and fear." UK Anime Network gave the first volume a perfect score based on the engrossing story, but felt the artwork, while appealing, was not "groundbreaking". On the other hand, Active Anime felt the art improved across the manga's serialization.

A.E. Sparrow of IGN described Monster as a "Hitchcock film set to manga" and felt its real strength comes from its huge cast of interesting characters, who each have "a unique story and history to relate". Carlo Santos, also for Anime News Network, called Monster "a one-of-a-kind thriller" and suggests that one of the most overlooked qualities of it is that "amidst all the mystery and horror, there are moments of love and hope and all the good things about humanity." Though she praised the manga for its "cinematically precise" art, never confusing the reader, and making each person visually distinct despite the large cast of characters, Casey Brienza from the same website felt that too much time was spent developing minor characters "who are likely to be dead or forgotten just a few dozen pages later," and that the series' ending "went out with a whimper." Brienza noted that "there is nothing satisfactory ever revealed to fully account for [Johan's] supremely scrambled psyche," but concluded that as long as the reader does not look for "deep meanings or think too hard about whether or not it all makes sense in the end" they will enjoy it. Leroy Douresseaux of Comic Book Bin, praised Monsters finale and wrote that the manga is "worth reading again and again. It's perfection".

AnimeTHEM Anime Reviews called the anime adaptation "complex" and "beautiful", stating that it features "sophisticated storytelling and complex plot weaving, memorable characters, godly production values and excellent pacing". Darius Washington of Otaku USA named Monster one of the ten best anime of the past decade. Carl Kimlinger enthused that "It cannot be overstated how brilliantly apart from the anime mainstream this unsettling, fiercely intelligent, and ultimately uncategorizable journey into darkness is." He praised Madhouse's animation for not only keeping up the dark "cinematic quality of Urasawa's art" but also improving on it, as well as Kuniaki Haishima's score for adding "immeasurably to the series' hair-raising atmosphere." Though he noted Viz Media's inability to acquire the original ending theme song due to licensing problems, Kimlinger also called their English dub of the series one of the best in recent memory.

Kimlinger praised the series, for "its fidelity to Naoki Urasawa's original manga", commenting that "there isn't a scene left out, only a handful added in, and as far as I can tell not a line of dialogue changed or omitted. Given its faithfulness, fans of the manga will know that the series won't get any better than this, this is as good as the series gets." As well as for its frequent habit of giving the spotlight to newly introduced characters instead of the main cast. He also described the ending of the series as, "we feel vaguely let down when what we should really be doing is glorying in the somewhat messy, yes, but exhilarating final throes of one of last decade's great series". Nonetheless, he considered such ending to be expected, since "as ambitious and complicated and just plain huge as Monster'' is, no conclusion is going to be entirely satisfactory. Someone is bound to get short-changed, loose ends are bound to be left dangling, and even if they weren't, the simple truth is that no climax could ever live up to the series' build-up".

References

External links
  
 
 
 

1994 manga
2002 Japanese novels
2004 anime television series debuts
Anime series based on manga
Comics set in Germany
Crime in anime and manga
Fictional criminologists
Madhouse (company)
Medical anime and manga
Mystery anime and manga
Naoki Urasawa
Nippon TV original programming
Odex
Philosophical anime and manga
Psychological thriller anime and manga
Seinen manga
Shogakukan manga
Fiction about suicide
Viz Media anime
Viz Media manga
Winner of Tezuka Osamu Cultural Prize (Grand Prize)
Winners of the Shogakukan Manga Award for general manga
Wrongful convictions in fiction